Brighton Football Club was an Australian rules football club which played in the Victorian Football Association (VFA). The club was based in the Melbourne suburb of Brighton, and was nicknamed the Penguins. After suffering financial hardship throughout the 1950s, Brighton moved to Caulfield and became the Caulfield Bears in the early to mid-1960s.

History
An advertisement in The Argus on 8 June 1859 announced a meeting to be held on the 9th of that month, at the Devonshire Hotel, to form the Brighton Football Club. There are references to an active Brighton Park club in 1867, and Brighton Football club in 1872, 1878, 1882 and 1883. Those clubs may or may not have been connected.

The club is believed to have been formed in 1885 and seven years later became a foundation member of the Metropolitan Junior Football Association. They won a premiership in 1903 during their sixteen years in the league and in 1908 joined the VFA as one of the teams to replace Richmond, who had shifted to the Victorian Football League (VFL), and West Melbourne, who had merged with North Melbourne in a failed attempt to do the same. During this time, Brighton played its home matches at the Brighton Beach Oval, before shifting to Elsternwick Park in 1927.

Brighton first played finals football in the VFA in 1926 with help from former Fitzroy player Gordon Rattray who coached the club. They made it all the way to the grand final before losing to Coburg, the club that would beat them again in the grand final the following season. They were runners-up in 1938.

Brighton almost folded while the Association was in recess during World War II, but was able to compile a committee and resume playing in 1945 when the Association resumed. Four years later, in 1948, the club won its first and only top division premiership. Under the coaching of Col Williamson, they had finished the home and away season in third place and after defeating Brunswick in the preliminary final they qualified for the decider against Williamstown, whom they downed by nine points.

The club was one of several which struggled badly both on and off the field after the throw-pass era ended in 1950. In twelve seasons from 1952 until 1963, the club won eight wooden spoons, including the first three Division 2 wooden spoons in 1961, 1962 and 1963. The club had a very low supporter base, a very small group of committeemen, who were increasingly unable to manage all of the administrative work, it struggled to retain players, and, in some seasons, it had to operate as an amateur club due to lack of money.

Coupled with its existing off-field problems, the club lost occupancy of its home ground at Elsternwick Park after the 1961 season. The club managed to survive, after merging with the South Caulfield Football Club, which played in Federal Football League, forming a new team known as Brighton-Caulfield. The merger did not help the club's on-field performances, and its first two seasons as a merged club yielded wooden spoons. The club's on-field performance briefly improved in 1964, when it recruited a core of twelve senior players from defending Division 1 premier Moorabbin after that club's sudden expulsion from the VFA just before the season.

After competing as Brighton-Caulfield for three seasons, the club eliminated almost all links to its Brighton heritage in 1965 as it sought to appeal more strongly to fans in its new suburb. The name was shortened to Caulfield, the Penguin emblem was replaced with a Bear, and the club's colours were changed from maroon and gold to blue and white, effectively bringing an end to the Brighton Football Club's existence. The club competed in the Association as the Caulfield Football Club until the end of the 1987 season.

Premiership Honours
Victorian Football Association (1)
1948

Runners Up
Victorian Football Association
1938

Notable players
 Carlton – Norm Clark, Percy Daykin, Harry Vallence and Keith Warburton
 Collingwood – John Harris
 Fitzroy – Barclay Bailes and Gordon Rattray
 Melbourne - Hugh Purse
 South Melbourne – Bruce Sloss
 St Kilda – Jack Connell, Gordon Dangerfield and Keith Miller

References

External links

 Brighton FC on Fullpointsfooty
 Caulfield Bears (successor club)

Brighton Football Club
Australian rules football clubs in Melbourne
1885 establishments in Australia
1964 disestablishments in Australia
Australian rules football clubs established in 1885
Australian rules football clubs disestablished in 1964